Martin Lamprecht (born 31 May 1963) is a Swedish modern pentathlete. He competed at the 1984 Summer Olympics.

References

External links
 

1963 births
Living people
Swedish male modern pentathletes
Olympic modern pentathletes of Sweden
Modern pentathletes at the 1984 Summer Olympics
Sportspeople from Stockholm